Listen to Me may refer to:

 Listen to Me (film), 1989 American drama film
 Listen to Me (album), 1991 album by Prudence Liew
 "Listen to Me" (The Hollies song), 1968 song by The Hollies
 "Listen to Me", 1957 song by Buddy Holly, B-side to "I'm Gonna Love You Too"
 Listen to Me, 2022 novel by Tess Gerritsen

See also
 Listen to Me: Buddy Holly, 2011 tribute album